List of Afghan Rulers in present-day Afghanistan with capital at Herat     

Herat
Afghanistan-related lists